Brian Pink was the Australian Statistician, the head of the Australian Bureau of Statistics (ABS), between 5 March 2007  and 12 January 2014.

Prior to September 1999, Brian Pink was ABS's Statistical Support Group Manager, when he was appointed as the Government Statistician for New Zealand and Chief Executive of Statistics New Zealand.

Biography
Pink's career in official statistics began in Australia with the then Commonwealth Bureau of Census and Statistics in Sydney in 1966, followed by postings to various state offices of its successor, the Australian Bureau of Statistics. He was Government Statistician and Chief Executive of Statistics New Zealand from late October 2000 to March 2007.

As well as his duties as ex officio member of the Australian Statistics Advisory Council, Pink is Vice Chairman of the OECD Committee on Statistics, and Australia's Head of Delegation to the United Nations Statistical Commission. He was President of the International Association for Official Statistics from 2005 to 2007.

Brian Pink professes strong views about the importance of the role of official statistics in society, beyond necessary government use.

Controversy

Brian Pink has been involved in a number of controversies relating to employees of the ABS.

Bulletin

In April 2008, the distribution of a staff bulletin by union employees led Brian Pink to issue a letter which advised employees that continued distribution of bulletins would be in breach of the Australian Public Service Code of Conduct. This led to Federal Court action which was settled in mediation.

Sackings

In April 2009, the ABS was taken to the Australian Industrial Relations Commission by the Community and Public Sector Union for the manner in which staff were terminated, which resulted in a decision against the ABS.

References

Australian public servants
Government Statisticians of New Zealand
Living people
Australian statisticians
Year of birth missing (living people)
21st-century Australian public servants
21st-century New Zealand public servants

ja:デニス・トレウィン